Thomas Henry Knyvett Dashwood (3 January 1876 – 24 January 1929) was an English first-class cricketer. Dashwood was a right-handed batsman.

Dashwood made his county cricket debut for Hertfordshire in the Minor Counties Championship against Norfolk. From 1898 to 1907, Dashwood played eighteen Minor Counties Championship matches for Hertfordshire, with his final match for the county coming against the Lancashire Second XI

Dashwood went up to University College, Oxford, in 1895 and made his first-class debut for Oxford University, playing two matches for the University in 1899 against Surrey and Sussex, where he made his maiden and only first-class half century with a score of 70. In 1899, Dashwood also represented an England XI against the touring Australians.

In 1902 Dashwood toured the West Indies with RA Bennett's XI, playing thirteen first-class matches, including against the teams of Barbados, Jamaica, Trinidad, British Guiana and the West Indies themselves.

In 1904 Dashwood represented Hampshire in two first-class matches against Leicestershire and Yorkshire, the second of which was Dashwood's final first-class match.

Dashwood died in West Kensington, London on 24 January 1929 from heart failure as a result of influenza.

References

External links
Thomas Dashwood at Cricinfo
Thomas Dashwood at CricketArchive
Matches and detailed statistics for Thomas Dashwood

1876 births
1929 deaths
Alumni of University College, Oxford
Cricketers from Hertfordshire
Deaths from influenza
English cricketers
Hampshire cricketers
Hertfordshire cricketers
Oxford University cricketers
People from North Hertfordshire District
R. A. Bennett's XI cricketers